Notable people with the name Welcome include:


Given name 
Welcome Chapman (1805–1893), early Mormon leader born in Readsboro, Vermont
Welcome Gaston (1874–1944), professional baseball player
Welcome Ncita (born 1965), former professional boxer
Welcome W. Wilson, Sr. (born 1928), chairman of the board of regents of the University of Houston System (Texas)

Surname 
Georgie Welcome (born 1985), Honduran football striker currently in the Honduras national football team
Henry Wellcome (1853–1936), American-British pharmaceutical entrepreneur
Shannon Welcome (born 1988), Honduran football player
Thelma Kingsbury (later Thelma Welcome, born 1911), English-born American sportswoman
Verda Welcome (1907–1990), American teacher, civil rights leader, and Maryland state senator